Liu Changcheng is the name of:

Liu Changcheng (skier) (born 1961), Chinese alpine skier
Liu Changcheng (volleyball) (born 1964), Chinese volleyball player